William Gyloth (also Gillot) (d. 1428) was a Canon of Windsor from 1401 to 1428.

Career
He was appointed:
Rector of St Andrew Hubbard 1421 - 1427
Steward of St George's Chapel, Windsor 1410
 
He was appointed to the eleventh stall in St George's Chapel, Windsor Castle in 1428 and held the canonry until 1432.

Notes 

1428 deaths
Canons of Windsor
Year of birth unknown